Cameron Britton (born ) is an American actor known for his role as Ed Kemper in the Netflix crime drama television series Mindhunter, for which he received a Primetime Emmy Award nomination for Outstanding Guest Actor in a Drama Series and Hazel in the Netflix television series The Umbrella Academy.

Early life
Britton grew up in Sonoma County, California, graduating from Analy High School in Sebastopol in 2004. He worked as a preschool teacher for eight years, where he taught special needs children ranging from 18 months to 3 years old.

Career
Britton had his breakout role as Ed Kemper in the 2017 Netflix crime drama Mindhunter. He played hacker Plague in the 2018 crime thriller film The Girl in the Spider's Web. In the Netflix TV show The Umbrella Academy, he played the role of Hazel, a time-travelling assassin.

He stars as the falsely suspected 1996 Olympic Games bomber Richard Jewell in the second season of the Manhunt drama anthology series.

Filmography

Film

Television

Awards and nominations

References

External links

Living people
American male television actors
21st-century American male actors
American male film actors
Year of birth missing (living people)